Phtheochroa dodrantaria is a species of moth of the family Tortricidae. It is found in Lebanon, the Near East and on Cyprus.

References

Moths described in 1970
Phtheochroa